Gonçalo Filipe Carvalho Quinaz Pereira (born 18 June 1985), known as Quinaz, is a Portuguese former professional footballer who played as a left winger.

Club career
Born in Lisbon, Quinaz joined local Odivelas FC's youth system at the age of 9. He competed in the lower leagues until the age of 26, also representing C.A. Pêro Pinheiro, Atlético Clube do Cacém and C.D. Pinhalnovense.

Quinaz signed with C.D. Aves in summer 2011, making his debut as a professional on 21 August as he started and scored in a 3−2 away loss against C.F. União. He split the 2012−13 season with fellow Segunda Liga clubs Atlético Clube de Portugal and Portimonense SC, helping the latter vie for promotion to the Primeira Liga in his first year in an eventual sixth-place finish. 

In early August 2014, Quinaz returned to Atlético after an unsuccessful trial in Spain with CD Atlético Baleares. He scored five goals in 32 games in the first year in his second spell, but the campaign ended in relegation from the second division (later avoided due to S.C. Beira-Mar's financial irregularities).

Personal life
Quinaz had a relationship with model Nereida Gallardo, who also dated Cristiano Ronaldo. In October 2015, he suspended his contract with Atlético to enter the reality show A Quinta as an anonymous contestant. Having finished fourth, he then participated in Secret Story: Desafio Final 4 in 2017, and achieved the same position. 

In 2021, Quinaz participated in Big Brother: Duplo Impacto, retiring after 65 days. The following year, he entered Big Brother: Desafio Final.

References

External links

1985 births
Living people
Portuguese footballers
Footballers from Lisbon
Association football wingers
Liga Portugal 2 players
Segunda Divisão players
Odivelas F.C. players
C.D. Pinhalnovense players
C.D. Aves players
Atlético Clube de Portugal players
Portimonense S.C. players